The Banu Ifran (Banu Yafran) or Ifranids, were a Zenata Berber tribe prominent in the history of pre-Islamic and early Islamic North Africa. In the 8th century, they established a kingdom in the central Maghreb, with Tlemcen as its capital.

Prior to the 8th century, the Banu Ifran resisted or revolted against foreign occupiers—Romans, Vandals, and Byzantines—of their territory in Africa. In the seventh century, they sided with Kahina in her resistance against the Muslim Umayyad invaders. In the eighth century they mobilized around the Sufri dogma, revolting against the Arab Umayyads and Abbasids. 

In the 10th century they founded a dynasty opposed to the Fatimids, the Zirids, the Umayyads, the Hammadids and the Maghraoua. The Banu Ifran were defeated by the Almoravids and the invading Arabs (the Banu Hilal and the Banu Sulaym) at the end of the 11th century.
The Ifranid dynasty was recognized as the only dynasty that defended the indigenous people of the Maghreb, by the Romans referred to as the Africani.
In 11th century Iberia, the Ifranids founded a Taifa of Ronda in 1039 at Ronda in Andalusia and governed from Cordoba for several centuries.

Etymology 
The name of the Berber dynasty "Ifran" is the plural form of the Berber language word "ifri" or "afri" which means "cave / tunnel". Other possibilities are that their name is derived from one of the major gods of the pagan Berbers, Ifru or Ifrou, or that the name is derived from the region of Yifran in present-day north-west Libya where they may have originated.

The name of the Ifran tribe has many alternative spellings, such as Ifuraces or Afar in Latin, or Ifrinidi, Iforen, Fren, Wafren, Yefren, Yafren, or Yafran, but all of the names mean simply "The Sons of Ifri". The Arabic prefix banu- was added by the Muslim writers and is equal to the Berber prefix "ayt" which means: "the sons of" or "those of".

History

Early history 

The oldest mentions concerning the Banu Ifran situate the bulk of their people in the western region of Mauretania Caesariensis. The Banu Ifran were one of the four major tribes of the Zenata or Gaetulia confederation in the Aurès Mountains , and were known as expert cavalrymen. According to Ibn Khaldoun, "Ifrinides" or "Ait Ifren" successfully resisted Romans, Vandals and Byzantines who sought to occupy North Africa before the arrival of the Muslim armies. According to Corippus in his Iohannis, during the reign of Justinian I between 547 and 550, the Banu Ifran challenged the Byzantine armies under John Troglita to war. Their chief Abu Qurra rebuilt the city of Tlemcen in Algeria in 765 (previously, it was a Roman city named Pomaria) and established an emirate based here. 

In the 10th century the Ifranids were enemies with the Fatimid Caliphate, aligning themselves with the Maghrawa tribe and the Umayyad Caliphate of Córdoba, although they themselves became Kharijites. Led by Abu Yazid, they surged east and attacked Kairouan in 945. Another leader, Ya'la ibn Muhammad captured Oran and constructed a new capital, Ifgan, near Mascara. Under the leadership of their able general Jawhar, who killed Ya'la, in battle in 954, the Fatimids struck back and destroyed Ifgan, and for some time afterward the Banu Ifran reverted to being scattered nomads in perpetual competition with their Sanhaja neighbours. Some settled in regions of Spain, such as Málaga. Others, led by Hammama, managed to gain control of the Moroccan province of Tadla. Later, led by Abu al-Kamāl, they established a new capital at Salé on the Atlantic coast, though this brought them into conflict with the Barghawata tribes on the seaboard. The Banu Ifran had also founded Tadla and Sale where Tamim ibn Ziri built the Great Mosque of Sale.

Banu Ifran in the Maghreb al-Aqsa 
During the 11th century, the Banu Ifran contested with the Maghrawa tribe for the control of the Maghreb al-Aqsa (present-day Morocco) after the fall of the Idrisid dynasty. Ya'la's son Yaddū took Fes by surprise in January 993 and held it for some months until the Maghrawa ruler Ziri ibn Atiyya returned from Spain and reconquered the region.

In May or June 1033, Fes was recaptured by Ya'la's grandson Tamīm. Fanatically devoted to religion, he began a persecution of the Jews, and is said to have killed 6000 of their men while confiscating their wealth and women, but Ibn Khaldun says only persecution without killing. It was described to have been a bloodbath and the women were reduced to slavery while the men were massacred. Sometime in the period 1038–1040 the Maghrawa tribe retook Fes, forcing Tamīm to flee to Salé.

Soon after that time, the Almoravids began their rise to power and effectively conquered both the Banu Ifran and their brother-rivals the Maghrawa.

Banu Ifran in Al-Andalus 

The Banu Ifran were influential in al-Andalus (present-day Spain) in the 11th century AD: the Ifran house of Corra ruled the Andalusian city of Ronda. Yeddas was the military leader of the Berber troops who were at war against the Christian king and El Mehdi. Abu Nour or Nour of the house of Corra became lord of Ronda and then Seville in Andalusia from 1023 to 1039 and from 1039 to 1054. The son of Nour bin Badis Hallal ruled Ronda from 1054 to 1057, and Abu Nacer from 1057 to 1065.

Religion

Before Islam

Among the Ifran, animism was the principal spiritual philosophy. Ifri was also the name of a Berber deity, and their name may have an origin in their beliefs.
Ifru rites symbolized in caves were held to gain favor or protection for merchants and traders. The myth of this protection is befittingly depicted on Roman coins.

Ifru was regarded as a sun goddess, cave goddess and protector of the home. Ifru or Ifran was regarded as a Berber version of Vesta.

Dehia, usually referred to as The Kahina was the Dejrawa Berber queen, prophetess, and leader of the non-Muslim response to the advancing Arab armies. Some historians claim Kahina was Christian, or a follower of the Judaic faith, though few of the Ifran were Christians, even after more than half a millennium of Christianity among the urban populations and the more sedentary tribes. Ibn Khaldun simply states that the Ifran were Berbers, and says nothing of their religion before the advent of Islam.

During Islam
The Banu Ifran were opposed to the Sunnis of the Arab armies. They eventually converted, but joined the Kharidjite movement within Islam.
Ibn Khaldun claimed that the "Zenata people say they are Muslims but they still oppose the Arab army". After 711, the Berbers were systematically converted to Islam and many became devout members of the faith.

Notes

References 

 Ibn Abi Zar, Rawd al-Qirtas. Annotated Spanish translation: A. Huici Miranda, Rawd el-Qirtas. 2nd edition, Anubar Ediciones, Valencia, 1964. Vol. 1 .
 C. Agabi (2001), article "Ifren" in Encyclopédie Berbère vol. 24, p. 3657–3659 (Édisud, Aix-en-Provence)
 Ibn Khaldun, Kitab el Ibar, French translation
 Le passé de l'Afrique du Nord. Écrit par E.F. Gautier. Édition Payot, Paris
 KITAB EL-ISTIQÇA. TRADUCTION A. GRAULLE. Auteur AHMED BEN KHALED EN-NACIRI ES-SLAOUI
 Ibn Khaldoun Les prolégomènes El Mokadima
 Gisèle Halimi. Title: La Kahina.

Berber dynasties

Medieval Algeria
History of Seville
History of Andalusia
Dynasties in al-Andalus
History of North Africa
States and territories established in the 8th century
States and territories disestablished in the 11th century
8th-century establishments in Africa
11th-century disestablishments in Africa
1066 disestablishments
11th century in Al-Andalus
Former countries in Africa
Zenata
Kharijites